Oscar Hirsh Davis (February 27, 1914 – June 19, 1988) was a judge of the United States Court of Claims and a United States Circuit Judge of the United States Court of Appeals for the Federal Circuit.

Education and career

Born on February 27, 1914, in New York City, New York, Davis received an Artium Baccalaureus degree in 1934 from Harvard University and a Bachelor of Laws in 1937 from Columbia Law School. He entered private practice in New York City from 1937 to 1939. He was an attorney in the Claims Division of the United States Department of Justice from 1939 to 1942. He was a Captain in the United States Army Air Corps from 1942 to 1946. He was an attorney in the Civil Division of the United States Department of Justice from 1946 to 1948. He was second assistant to the United States Solicitor General from 1950 to 1954 and first assistant from 1954 to 1962.

Federal judicial service

Davis was nominated by President John F. Kennedy on January 31, 1962, to a seat on the United States Court of Claims vacated by Judge J. Warren Madden. He was confirmed by the United States Senate on April 11, 1962, and received his commission on April 12, 1962. He was a member of the Judicial Conference of the United States from 1977 to 1978. He was reassigned by operation of law to the United States Court of Appeals for the Federal Circuit on October 1, 1982, to a new seat authorized by 96 Stat. 25. His service terminated on June 19, 1988, due to his death of cancer in Washington, D.C.

References

Sources
 

1914 births
1988 deaths
Harvard University alumni
Columbia Law School alumni
Judges of the United States Court of Claims
Judges of the United States Court of Appeals for the Federal Circuit
20th-century American judges
United States Army Air Forces officers
United States Army Air Forces personnel of World War II
United States federal judges appointed by John F. Kennedy